This article aims to describe the phonology and phonetics of central Luxembourgish, which is regarded as the emerging standard.

Consonants

The consonant inventory of Luxembourgish is quite similar to that of Standard German.

  are bilabial,  is bilabial-labiodental, whereas  are labiodental.
  occurs only in loanwords from Standard German. Just as among many native German-speakers, it tends to be simplified to  word-initially. For example,  ('obligation') is pronounced , or in careful speech .
  is realized as  when it occurs after , e.g.   ('two').
  are voiceless fortis . They are aspirated  in most positions, but not when  or  precedes in the same syllable, or when another plosive or affricate follows. The fortis affricates are unaspirated and thus contrast with the lenis ones by voicing alone.
  are unaspirated lenis, more often voiceless  than voiced . The lenis affricates are truly voiced.
  and  only contrast between vowels.  does not occur word-initially except in French and English loanwords.
  are velar,  is palatal whereas  is uvular.
The fricative variant is used after short vowels before consonants. If the consonant is voiceless, the fricative is also voiceless, i.e. .
  have two types of allophones: alveolo-palatal  and uvular . The latter occur after back vowels, whereas the former occur in all other positions.
 The  allophone appears only in a few words intervocalically, e.g.   ('mirror'),   (inflected form of   'high'). Note that an increasing number of speakers do not distinguish between the alveolo-palatal allophones  and the postalveolar phonemes .

Furthermore, some unusual consonant clusters may arise post-lexically after cliticisation of the definite article  (for feminine, neuter and plural forms), e.g. Due to cluster simplification this article often disappears entirely between consonants.

Word-final obstruents
For instance,  (phonemically ) is pronounced , although this article transcribes it  so that it corresponds more closely to the spelling. Similarly,  is pronounced  ('an interesting idea'), with a voiced .

Pronunciation of the letter g
In Luxembourgish, the letter g has no fewer than nine possible pronunciations, depending both on the origin of a word and the phonetic environment. Words from French, English and (in a few cases) German have introduced  (devoiced ) in other environments, and French orthography's "soft g" indicates  (devoiced ).

Vowels

  are close to the corresponding cardinal vowels .
 Some speakers may realize  as open-mid , especially before .
  is most usually realized as a mid central vowel with slight rounding.
 Before ,  is realized as open-mid .
 The quality of  matches the prototypical IPA value of the  symbol.
  is the realization of a non-prevocalic, unstressed sequence .
  is near-open .
 , a phonological back vowel (the long counterpart of ), is phonetically near-front .
 The nasal vowels appear only in loanwords from French, whereas the oral front rounded vowels appear in loans from both French and German.
 The opposition between close-mid and open-mid vowels does not exist in native Luxembourgish words. In non-native words, there is a marginal contrast between the close-mid  and the open-mid .
 The short non-native  is distinct from  only on a phonemic level, as the latter is fronted and unrounded to  before velars (cf. the surname  ). In other positions, they are perceived as the same sound, as shown in the spelling of the word   'public' (loaned from German  , meaning the same).
 The first elements of  may be phonetically short  in fast speech or in unstressed syllables.
 The centering diphthongs end in the mid central unrounded area .
  appears only in loanwords from Standard German.

The  and  contrasts arose from a former lexical tone contrast: the shorter  were used in words with Accent 1, whereas the lengthened  were used in words with Accent 2 (see Pitch-accent language#Franconian dialects.) The difference is phonemic in both cases and there are minimal pairs such as   'elevated' vs.   'decent' and   'rotten' vs.   'lazy'. The diphthongs contrast mainly in monosyllabics. In penultimate syllables, the short  occur mainly before voiced consonants and in hiatus, whereas the long  occur mainly before voiceless consonants (including phonetically voiceless consonants that are voiced in their underlying form).

Additional phonetic diphthongs  arise after vocalisation of  after long vowels. It is also sporadically retained in the environments where it is vocalized after other long vowels, which is why the merger with the monophthong  is assumed to be phonetic, rather than phonemic.

Sample
The sample text is a reading of the first sentence of The North Wind and the Sun. The transcription is based on a recording of a 26-year-old male speaker of Central Luxembourgish.

Phonemic transcription

Phonetic transcription

Orthographic version

References

Bibliography

Further reading

 

phonology
Germanic phonologies